Italy, Spain, and Portugal are traditionally Roman Catholic and according to the 2005 Eurobarometer Poll retain an above-average belief in God. France is traditionally Roman Catholic as well and has an above-average fraction of atheists. Romania and Moldova are Eastern Orthodox countries and both are very religious.

The Neopagan movements found in Latin Europe can be divided into New Age spirituality inspired by Celtic, Norse or Megalithic templates on one hand (Neodruidism, Neoshamanism), polytheistic reconstructionism, either focusing on the ancient Roman religion or other native religions of Latin Europe (such as those of pre-Roman Iberia, Italy, and Romania), and political Neopaganism as part of Alain de Benoist's far-right ideology of the Nouvelle Droite on the other.

France
In the 1980s, Alain de Benoist theorized the Nouvelle Droite movement, creating the GRECE in 1968 with the Club de l'Horloge. They advocated a right-wing, ethno-nationalism stance focused on European culture, which advocated a return of paganism. Members of the GRECE quit the think tank in the 1980s, such as Pierre Vial who joined the FN, or Guillaume Faye who quit the organization along with others members in 1986. Faye participated in 2006 in a conference in the US organized by the American Renaissance white separatist magazine published by the New Century Foundation. The philosophical background uniting Neopaganism and the Nouvelle Droite is the occultist or esoteric literature of "Radical Traditionalism" of René Guénon, Julius Evola and others. The influence of the Nouvelle Droite goes beyond France and is found in e.g., Belgian (Flemish) neopaganism, such as the brand of Asatru advocated by Flemish neo-fascist and high priest Koenraad Logghe.

The Libre Assemblée Païenne Francophone (LAPF) self-identifies as an association of "convinced free-thinking and humanist pagans". Their Horizons Païens journal appears twice yearly (since 2005). They oppose all kinds of ethnic discrimination.

Spain

In 2004, Cardinal Alfonso Lopez Trujillo, president of the Pontifical Council for the Family issued a warning that "Spain is at risk from the spread of neo-paganism":
In some countries of Europe, there is a temptation to embrace neo-paganism, and although I do not believe that Spain is immediately at risk, nevertheless the risk exists because in today’s world everything gets passed around.

On December 23, 2011, the Spanish Government officially acknowledged Wicca to be a religion,  in the Register of religious bodies with the reference 2560-SG / A, being the first country for Europe and the second in the world after U.S., to recognize it. Celtiberian tradition of Wicca, consisting of Fernando Gonzalez  in the 1980s from the Hispanic Traditional Witchcraft to which he belongs, is a structured religion through the symbiosis between "traditionalism wizard" (inciatic and mystery), the historical reconstructionist (cultural and archaeological) and "adaptationism" liturgical (conditioning ceremonial) of Hispanic Traditional Witchcraft, paganism, religious worship pre-Christian Celtic and Iberian mainly and those that were previously formed (shamanism, Neolithic and Paleolithic cults).

There is a small amount of Germanic neopaganism found in Spain, which includes the Comunidad Odinista de España-Asatru (COE) founded as Circulo Odinista Español in 1981. The COE was recognized by the Spanish government as a religion, allowing them to perform "legally binding civil ceremonies", such as marriages. COE is the fourth Odinist/Asatru religious organization in the world to be recognized with official status, after those in Iceland, Norway and Denmark. In December 2007, they conducted first legal pagan wedding in Spain, on the beach of Vilanova, Barcelona.

Portugal
Following the line of visibility that the Wiccan Religious Confession, Celtiberian Tradition, imposed throughout the institution, this Tradition Wicca also established in Portugal has taken the first step and once applied for registration in the relevant Register, has just been registered and is therefore has become the first Confession Pagan recognized as religion in the history of Portugal. Thus, the Portuguese public administration has been entered in the Register of Religious Entities Religious Confession to Wicca, Celtiberian tradition with the nomenclature: Data of Criação: 26/6/12 Confissão Wiccan Religious Celtiberian. Permanent Representação. NIPC: 980474531 - CAE / P: 94910. This milestone is also clear that Portugal is de facto the second country in Europe and third in the world after the U.S. and Spain, to legalize a Wiccan Religious Worship.

Romania
See: Zalmoxianism

See also
European Congress of Ethnic Religions
List of modern pagan temples
Neopaganism in German-speaking Europe
Polytheistic reconstructionism
Revival of Roman paganism

References

Ethnologie française, numéro 4 - 2000 : Les nouveaux mouvements religieux (2001), .
Francesco Faraoni, Il Neopaganesimo, Aradia Edizioni (2006), .
Cronos, Wicca - la nuova era della Vecchia Religione, Aradia Edizioni (2007), .

External links
Studio sulle correnti della tradizione pagana romana in Italia
I Celti in Italia
Les Fils d'Odin

Latin
Modern paganism in France
Modern paganism in Spain
Modern paganism in Italy